Victor Osipov (born 8 October 1971) is a Moldovan politician who since 18 February 2015 has served as Deputy Prime Minister for Reintegration of the Republic of Moldova, being the second time in this post after the 2009-2011 mandate in the Filat Government. He was the Deputy Prime Minister in charge of Moldova's territorial re-integration in the First Vlad Filat Cabinet. 

Victor Osipov was the first vice-president of the Party Alliance Our Moldova (2009-2011).

Biography
Victor Osipov was born on 8 October 1971 in the village of Popeasca, Ștefan Vodă District.

Education
In 1993, he graduated from the Faculty of Journalism and Communication Sciences of the State University of Moldova, and in 2008 - the European Institute of Political Studies of the Republic of Moldova.

Professional activity
 1992 to 1995 - editor, commentator, head of the division of the "Radio Moldova International".
 1996 to 2000 - Director of Radio d'Or of the OWH Association.
 2000 to 2003 - Director of the Municipal Television  "Euro TV Chişinău".
 2001 to 2004 - Executive Director of the APEL Electronic Press Association.

Political activity
In 2005 he became the councillor to the Our Moldova Alliance parliamentary faction and held office by 2009.  At the parliamentary elections held in April 2009, he was elected an MP from the lists of the Our Moldova Alliance.

By the Decree of the President of the Republic of Moldova no. 4-V of 25 September 2009 was appointed Deputy Prime Minister of the Republic of Moldova.

At the VIIIth Congress of "Our Moldova" Alliance, held on 12 December 2009, Victor Osipov was elected as the first deputy chairperson of the party.

In 2010, he participated at the parliament elections with the  Our Moldova Alliance (No. 2 in the list). The Alliance did not exceed the 4% electoral threshold, accruing only 2.05% of the votes validly cast.

On 9 March 2011 Victor Osipov announced his withdrawal from the political activity, implicitly, from the position of first deputy chairperson of AMN ("Our Moldova" Alliance).  In over a month the party "Our Moldova" merged with the Liberal Democratic Party of Moldova.

On 2 July 2014 Victor Osipov became the manager of the election campaign of the Democratic Party of Moldova for the parliamentary elections in the autumn 2014.

From 18 February 2015 he serves as Deputy Prime Minister of the Republic of Moldova in the Gaburici Cabinet and then in the Streleț Cabinet.

External links 
 Government of Moldova

References

 

Living people
1971 births
People from Ștefan Vodă District
Moldovan journalists
Male journalists
Moldova State University alumni
Members of the parliament of Moldova
Our Moldova Alliance politicians
Deputy Prime Ministers of Moldova
Moldovan MPs 2009